Abou is both a given name and a surname. It may refer to:
 Ayoub Abou
Samassi Abou (born 1973), Ivorian footballer
Abou Diaby (born 1986), French footballer
Abou Maïga (born 1985), Beninese footballer

See also
Abou Greisha

Feminine given names
Masculine given names